The Ryukyu Islands are a volcanic arc archipelago.

Ryukyu may also refer to:
 Kingdom of Ryukyu, a former kingdom annexed by the Empire of Japan
 Ryukyuan languages
 Ryukyuan people
 Ryukyu (My Hero Academia), a character in the manga series My Hero Academia

See also
 Okinawa (disambiguation)
 Okinawan (disambiguation)
 Liuqiu
 Lewchewan (disambiguation)

Language and nationality disambiguation pages